Panic the World (stylized as PANIC THE WORLD) is the third studio album by the Japanese girl idol girl group Onyanko Club. It was released in Japan on July 10, 1986.

Track listing

Charts

Weekly charts

References 

Onyanko Club albums
1986 albums
Pony Canyon albums